UP nahi dekha toh India nahi dekha  ( if you have not seen UP, then you have not seen India too) is tourism campaign launched by the Government of Uttar Pradesh in 2018 with the aim to attract more domestic and international tourists to the state. The Government also  engaged the Indian arm of McCann Erickson for its branding the CEO of which is eminent lyricist and writer Prasoon Joshi.

References

Tourism in Uttar Pradesh
Tourism campaigns